is a town in Kamikawa Subprefecture, Hokkaido, Japan.

As of September 2016, the town has an estimated population of 2,992.

Culture

Mascot

Ai-chanman is a superhero mushroom. He is unveiled in 1985.
Lovely-chan, like Ai-chanman, is also a superhero mushroom. She is also Ai-chanman's lover.

References

External links

Official Website 

Towns in Hokkaido